Hancock Township is a township in Carver County, Minnesota, United States. The population was 367 as of the 2000 census.

History
Hancock Township was organized in 1868, and named for Winfield Scott Hancock, a Union Army general in the Civil War, and afterward candidate for President of the United States.

Geography

Township 114 North, Range 25 West, Fifth Principal Meridian of the Public Land Survey System.

Lakes
 Assumption Lake

Adjacent townships
 Benton Township (north)
 Dahlgren Township (northeast)
 San Francisco Township (east)
 Faxon Township, Sibley County (south)
 Washington Lake Township, Sibley County (west)
 Young America Township (northwest)

Cemeteries
The township contains two cemeteries: Bovy Family Cemetery and West Union Lutheran Church Cemetery.

Demographics

As of the census of 2000, there were 367 people, 121 households, and 97 families residing in the township.  The population density was 20.7 people per square mile (8.0/km).  There were 125 housing units at an average density of 7.1/sq mi (2.7/km).  The racial makeup of the township was 95.91% White, 3.27% Asian, and 0.82% from two or more races. Hispanic or Latino of any race were 0.27% of the population.

There were 121 households, out of which 35.5% had children under the age of 18 living with them, 73.6% were married couples living together, 4.1% had a female householder with no husband present, and 19.8% were non-families. 16.5% of all households were made up of individuals, and 10.7% had someone living alone who was 65 years of age or older.  The average household size was 3.03 and the average family size was 3.43.

In the township the population was spread out, with 29.7% under the age of 18, 6.0% from 18 to 24, 30.2% from 25 to 44, 22.1% from 45 to 64, and 12.0% who were 65 years of age or older.  The median age was 36 years. For every 100 females, there were 105.0 males.  For every 100 females age 18 and over, there were 115.0 males.

The median income for a household in the township was $58,750, and the median income for a family was $70,938. Males had a median income of $36,250 versus $25,000 for females. The per capita income for the township was $20,568.  About 6.1% of families and 9.1% of the population were below the poverty line, including 12.1% of those under age 18 and 12.8% of those age 65 or over.

Politics

References
 United States National Atlas
 United States Census Bureau 2007 TIGER/Line Shapefiles
 United States Board on Geographic Names (GNIS)

Townships in Carver County, Minnesota
Townships in Minnesota